Association for Israel Studies (AIS) is an international, interdisciplinary scholarly society devoted to the academic and professional study of modern Israel.

History
Formed and charted in the US in 1985, the Association is open to all individuals who are engaged in, or share an interest in, the scholarly inquiry about Israel's history and society, as well as the Zionist movement and the pre-state Jewish community of Palestine. Until 2000, all annual conferences were held in the US, and since that year, the association holds its conferences in the US and in Israel. The meeting is spread across three days.

Membership and Affiliates
The Association's membership is composed of individual scholars from multiple fields of study. The association also offers institutional membership to college and university programs, departments, research institutions, and cultural organizations that focus on Israel Studies [2].

Officials
AIS President for the 2021-2023 period is Professor Arieh Saposnik[3]. Vice-president is Professor Raphael Cohen-Almagor [4] (Hull University). The organization's Executive Director is Dr. Asaf Shamis [5] (University of Haifa) and its Treasurer is Dr. Ilan Ben Ami [6] (The Open University of Israel). Former presidents includes: Prof. Myron (Mike) Aronoff, Prof. Robert Freedman, Prof. Ian Lustick, Prof. Pnina Lahav, Prof. Ilan Peleg, Prof. Hanna Herzog, Prof. Alan Dowty, Prof. Joel Migdal, Pro. Rachel Brenner, Prof. Ilan Troen, Prof. Aviva Halamish, Prof. Gad Barzilai, Prof. Menachem Hofnung, Prof. Donna Robinson Divine, and Prof. Yael Aronoff.

Awards
To recognize excellence in the field of Israel Studies, the Association offers the following awards:

AIS Lifetime Achievement Award honors a lifetime of exceptional scholarship and academic achievement in the field of Israel Studies. The award recognizes a senior scholar whose lasting and path-breaking contributions have significantly shaped the field.

AIS Early Career Award recognizes an exceptional scholar who has made significant contributions to the field of Israel Studies.

Yonathan Shapiro Award for Best Book in Israel Studies is given for the best book in Israel Studies published during the last calendar year. The award honors the memory of Yonathan Shapiro (1929-1997), one of Israel’s most distinguished and influential sociologists.

Ben Halpern Award for Best Dissertation in Israel Studies is given for the best doctoral dissertation in the various fields of Israel Studies approved during the last calendar year. The award honors the memory of Ben Halpern (1912-1990), a founding member of the Board of Directors of the Association.

Baruch Kimmerling Prize for Best Graduate Paper is given for the best paper presented by a graduate student at the last AIS annual meeting. This award honors the memory of Baruch Kimmerling (1939-2007), a leading public intellectual and sociologist in Israel.

Journal
In 1986, the AIS began to publish a scholarly journal, Israel Studies Review (ISR), published a few times a year by Berghahn Books. ISR explores modern and contemporary Israel from the perspective of the social sciences, history, the humanities, and cultural studies and welcomes submissions on these subjects. The journal also pays close attention to the relationships of Israel to the Middle East and to the wider world; it encourages scholarly articles with this broader theoretical or comparative approach provided the focus remains on modern Israel. 

One of the main tasks of the ISR is to review in a timely manner recent books on Israel-related themes, published in English and Hebrew. Authors and publishers are invited to send their books for review consideration.

The Israel Studies Review editors fully recognize the passions and controversies present in this field. They are dedicated to the mission of the ISR as a non-partisan journal publishing scholarship of the highest quality, and are proud to contribute to the growth and development of the field of Israel Studies.

References

External links
 http://www.aisisraelstudies.org/
 Mitchell Bard, Israel Studies in the United States: A Growth Industry, Israelis 8 (2017), pp. 215–236.
 The Woodman Scheller Israel Studies International Program (WSISIP) of the Ben-Gurion University of the Negev, 
 The Ben-Gurion Research Institute

Research institutes established in 1985
Learned societies of the United States
Middle Eastern studies in the United States
Israel studies
1985 establishments in the United States